Mwanhuzi is a small town in Simiyu Region, Tanzania, and the headquarters of Meatu District.

Transport
Unpaved trunk road T37 from Shinyanga to Singida Region passes through the town.

Population
According to the 2012 national census the population of Mwanhuzi ward was 20,175.

References

Wards of Tanzania
Populated places in Simiyu Region